László Szabó (2 November 1953 – August 2016) was a Hungarian sprint canoeist who competed in the late 1970s and early 1980s. He won a bronze medal in the K-4 10000 m at the 1979 ICF Canoe Sprint World Championships in Duisburg. Szabó also finished eighth in the K-2 500 m event at the 1980 Summer Olympics in Moscow.

References

László Szabó's profile at Sports Reference.com
László Szabó's obituary 

1953 births
2016 deaths
Canoeists at the 1980 Summer Olympics
Hungarian male canoeists
Olympic canoeists of Hungary
ICF Canoe Sprint World Championships medalists in kayak
20th-century Hungarian people